Futureversity is a British charity formerly known as Tower Hamlets Summer University.

Futureversity may also refer to:

Future University in Egypt, a north African university